Colin Best is an Irish international lawn bowler and former British champion.

Bowls career
Best won the Irish National Bowls Championships singles in 1993  and subsequently won the singles at the British Isles Bowls Championships in 1994.

References

Living people
Male lawn bowls players from Northern Ireland
Year of birth missing (living people)